Amália Bezerédj (1804–1837) was a Hungarian writer. She founded a school on her husband's estate and wrote  for her daughter. This is considered the first significant Hungarian children's book, although it and her other work, a reader for village children, were not published until three years after her death.

References 

1804 births
1837 deaths
19th-century Hungarian women writers
19th-century Hungarian writers